Flagellostomias boureei, the Longbarb dragonfish, is a species of barbeled dragonfish found in the ocean depths worldwide.  This species grows to a length of  SL.  This species is the only known species in its genus.

References
 

Stomiidae
Taxa named by Erich Zugmayer
Fish described in 1913